The 1999 Thalgo Australian Women's Hardcourts singles was the singles event of the third edition of the Thalgo Australian Women's Hardcourts; a WTA Tier III tournament held in the Gold Coast. Ai Sugiyama was the defending champion but lost in the semifinals to Patty Schnyder.

Schnyder won in the final 4–6, 7–6(7–5), 6–2 against Mary Pierce.

Seeds
The top two seeds received a bye to the second round.

Draw

Finals

Top half

Bottom half

Qualifying

Seeds

Qualifiers

Lucky losers
 ''' Brie Rippner

Qualifying draw

First qualifier

Second qualifier

Third qualifier

Fourth qualifier

External links
 1999 Thalgo Australian Women's Hardcourts Draw

Singles